Théo Bussière (born 18 January 1995) is a French competitive breaststroke swimmer. He competed for France in the 2016 Summer Olympics in the heats on the 4x100 meter relay.

References

External links

1995 births
Living people
French male breaststroke swimmers
Sportspeople from Rhône (department)
Olympic swimmers of France
Swimmers at the 2016 Summer Olympics
Swimmers at the 2020 Summer Olympics
Competitors at the 2019 Summer Universiade
20th-century French people
21st-century French people